Hyles is a genus of moths in the family Sphingidae.

Species

H. annei (Guerin-Meneville, 1839)
H. apocyni (Shchetkin, 1956)
H. biguttata (Walker, 1856)
H. calida (Butler, 1856)
H. centralasiae (Staudinger, 1887)
H. chamyla (Denso, 1913)
H. churkini Saldaitis & Ivinskis, 2006
H. chuvilini Eitschberger, Danner & Surholt, 1998
H. costata (von Nordmann, 1851)
H. cretica Eitschberger, Danner & Surholt, 1998
H. dahlii (Geyer, 1828)
H. euphorbiae (Linnaeus, 1758)
H. euphorbiarum (Guerin-Meneville & Percheron, 1835)
H. gallii (Rottemburg, 1775)
H. hippophaes (Esper, 1789)
H. lineata (Fabricius, 1775)
H. livornica (Esper, 1780)
H. livornicoides (Lucas, 1892)
H. malgassica (Denso, 1944)
H. nervosa Rothschild & Jordan, 1903
H. nicaea (von Prunner, 1798)
H. perkinsi (Swezey, 1920)
H. renneri Eitschberger, Danner & Surholt, 1998
H. robertsi (Butler, 1880)
H. salangensis (Ebert, 1969)
H. sammuti Eitschberger, Danner & Surholt, 1998
H. siehei (Pungeler, 1903)
H. stroehlei Eitschberger, Danner & Surholt, 1998
H. tithymali (Boisduval, 1834)
H. vespertilio (Esper, 1780)
H. wilsoni (Rothschild, 1894)
H. zygophylli (Ochsenheimer, 1808)

 
Macroglossini
Moth genera
Taxa named by Jacob Hübner